Lawrence A. MacAulay  (born September 9, 1946) is a Canadian politician, who has represented the riding of Cardigan, Prince Edward Island in the House of Commons since 1988.

On June 11, 1997, he joined the cabinet of Prime Minister Jean Chrétien as Minister of Labour and Minister responsible for Prince Edward Island. In 1998, he was appointed Solicitor General of Canada and served in that role until his resignation from Cabinet on October 21, 2002, during a conflict of interest inquiry. MacAuley served as a Liberal backbench member of Parliament (MP) through the rest of the Liberal years in power and as an opposition member during the Conservative government led by Stephen Harper (2006–2015). He is the former Secretary of State (Veterans) and Secretary of State (Atlantic Canada Opportunities Agency). He was also the Official Opposition Critic for Seniors.

On March 20, 2014, MacAulay became the longest-serving MP in the history of Prince Edward Island, surpassing the record previously set by Angus MacLean.

On November 4, 2015, he was appointed the Minister of Agriculture and Agri-Food by the new prime minister Justin Trudeau. On March 1, 2019, Trudeau shuffled his cabinet, appointing MacAulay as Minister of Veterans Affairs and Associate Minister of National Defence.

MacAulay lives in Prince Edward Island with his wife, Frances.

Controversy

In December 2022, MacAulay was confronted in parliament by other MPs on multiple reports of Veterans Affairs Canada offering medical assistance in dying (MAID) to veterans seeking medical care. Prime Minister Justin Trudeau described the incidents as "absolutely unacceptable".

Electoral record

References

External links
Official site
Bio & Mandate from Prime Minister

1946 births
Living people
People from Kings County, Prince Edward Island
Liberal Party of Canada MPs
Members of the House of Commons of Canada from Prince Edward Island
Members of the King's Privy Council for Canada
Solicitors General of Canada
Farmers from Prince Edward Island
Members of the 26th Canadian Ministry
Members of the 29th Canadian Ministry
Ministers of Labour of Canada
Agriculture ministers of Canada